The 2020–21 Ukrainian First League U–19 Championship was the 5th season of the Ukrainian Junior Under 19 Championship in First League. The competition involved participation of several junior teams of the Professional Football League of Ukraine as well as some other football academies.

Direct administration of the competition belonged to the Youth Football League of Ukraine. The tournament was conducted in cooperation between both Youth Football League and Professional Football League. Competitions started on 9 September 2020.

Teams
 Debut: Krystal Chortkiv, Skailark Kyiv, Arsenal Kyiv, Yednist Kyiv, DYuSSh-1-Kryvbas-84, Chornomorets Odesa, DYuSSh Kherson, KhDVUFK-1 Kharkiv, Maister miacha Kharkiv, Enerhiya Dnipro, OKKO Kharkiv
 Withdrawn: Adrenalin Lutsk, Dynamo Lviv, imeni Yashina Kyiv, Chempion Kyiv, Dnipro-1-Borysfen, Maoldis Dnipro, Nikopol, Petrykivka, Arena Kharkiv, Olimpik Kharkiv

Group stage

Group 1

Top goalscorers

Group 2

Top goalscorers

Group 3

Top goalscorers

Group 4

Top goalscorers

Finals

Quarterfinals

Four teams tournament 
The final tournament took place in Uman on June 4-5, 2021.

Semifinals

Game for 3rd place

Finals 

Notes

See also
2020–21 Ukrainian First League
2020–21 Ukrainian Second League

References

External links
 Season's results at the Youth Football League of Ukraine
 Gold Talant, general information on all youth competitions in Ukraine

First League
Junior Championship First League